The 1876–77 season was the fourth Scottish football season in which Dumbarton competed at a national level.

Scottish Cup

Despite an encouraging start in the campaign, by disposing of their local rivals Renton in the first round, Dumbarton disappointingly lost out to Lennox in the third round of the competition.

Friendlies

During the season, 8 'friendly' matches were reported to have been played, including home and away fixtures against local rivals, Vale of Leven and Glasgow side, South Western, of which 4 were won, 2 drawn and 2 lost, scoring 18 goals and conceding 6.

Player statistics

Only includes appearances and goals in competitive Scottish Cup matches.

Source:

References

Dumbarton F.C. seasons
Scottish football clubs 1876–77 season